Erik Hurtado (born November 15, 1990) is an American professional soccer player.

Club career
Born in Fredericksburg, Virginia, Hurtado moved with his mother to her hometown of Gresham, Oregon when he was six. He began playing club soccer in nearby Beaverton before moving with his family to Cuernavaca in Mexico. During his time in Mexico, Hurtado was invited to train with the youth academy at Liga MX side UNAM. He soon moved back to Beaverton and continued playing for his club side. During high-school, Hurtado played for both his high school team, the Westview Wildcats, and club side, Westside Metros.

In 2009, Hurtado moved to California and enrolled at Santa Clara University and played college soccer for the Santa Clara Broncos. He played four seasons for the Broncos, being named as the West Coast Conference Player of the Year in his senior year. He scored a total of 33 goals during his time with the Broncos.

While playing for the Santa Clara Broncos, Hurtado would spend the summer months playing for the Portland Timbers U23s of the Premier Development League. During the 2011 season, Hurtado was joint top scorer in the team with 8 goals. He returned to the Timbers U23s for the 2012 season.

Vancouver Whitecaps FC
After his senior year at Santa Clara, Hurtado attended the MLS Combine. He was rated as the seventh best forward option in the 2013 MLS SuperDraft and projected to be drafted late in the first round or early second round. On January 17, 2013, Hurtado was selected with the 5th overall pick by the Vancouver Whitecaps FC. He made his professional debut for the club on March 2, 2013, against Toronto FC. He came on as a 76th-minute substitute for Daigo Kobayashi as Vancouver won 1–0. Hurtado ended his first professional season with no goals from 15 appearances, four being starts.

Hurtado scored his first professional goal for the Whitecaps on May 10, 2014, against the Columbus Crew. His 37th-minute goal was the only one in a 1–0 victory. That goal was the first in a run of five matches in a row in which Hurtado managed to find the back of the net. He scored on May 14 against Toronto FC in the Canadian Championship before finding the net against the Seattle Sounders FC on May 24. He then scored in a 4–3 victory over his hometown Portland Timbers on June 1 before finishing his scoring run against the Philadelphia Union on June 7 in a 3–3 draw.

Hurtado then ended the 2014 season with one goal each in two matches against FC Dallas on September 13 and October 29.

On August 7, 2015, Hurtado was loaned out to Norwegian Tippeligaen side Mjøndalen for the rest of the 2015 season. He made his debut for the club on August 13 in the Norwegian Cup against Rosenborg. The next season, he returned to Vancouver having scored two goals in 24 matches.

Sporting Kansas City
On December 14, 2018, Hurtado was traded to Sporting Kansas City in exchange for their second-round pick in the 2020 MLS SuperDraft and their first-round pick in the 2021 MLS SuperDraft. He made his debut for Kansas City on February 21, 2019, in the CONCACAF Champions League against Toluca. He came on as an 82nd-minute substitute for Krisztián Németh as Sporting won 3–0. He scored his first goal for the club on August 4 against the Seattle Sounders FC. His 58th-minute goal was the third in a 3–2 victory.

On December 9, 2020, Hurtado was released by Sporting Kansas City following the 2020 season but was reported to be in discussions with the club regarding his future. On February 15, 2021, Hurtado announced that he had left the club.

CF Montréal
On February 16, 2021, Hurtado joined CF Montréal on a one-year deal, with an option for another. He made his debut on April 14 against Toronto FC, coming on as a substitute in the 4–2 victory.

Columbus Crew
On July 8, 2021, Hurtado was traded to the Columbus Crew in exchange for $200,000 in General Allocation Money. According to CF Montréal sporting director, Olivier Renard, the trade had to be made since Hurtado was not vaccinated against COVID-19 and thus would not be allowed to enter Canada when the rest of the team were allowed to return. Hurtado made his Crew debut the next day in a 2–2 away draw against FC Cincinnati. Following the 2021 season, Columbus opted to decline their contract option on Hurtado. However, Hurtado and Columbus came to terms on a new deal on February 3, 2022.

Hurtado scored his first goal for the club on May 7, 2022, helping secure a 2–2 tie versus the New England Revolution.

Career statistics

Club

Honors
Columbus Crew
 Campeones Cup: 2021

References

External links
Profile at the Major League Soccer website
Profile at Soccerway

1990 births
Living people
Sportspeople from Fredericksburg, Virginia
American soccer players
Association football forwards
Santa Clara Broncos men's soccer players
Portland Timbers U23s players
Vancouver Whitecaps FC players
Whitecaps FC 2 players
Mjøndalen IF players
Sporting Kansas City players
Sporting Kansas City II players
CF Montréal players
Columbus Crew players
Columbus Crew 2 players
USL League Two players
Major League Soccer players
USL Championship players
Eliteserien players
Soccer players from Virginia
American expatriate soccer players
Expatriate soccer players in Canada
Expatriate footballers in Norway
American expatriate sportspeople in Norway
Vancouver Whitecaps FC draft picks
United States men's youth international soccer players
Soccer players from Oregon
Sportspeople from Beaverton, Oregon
People from Gresham, Oregon
American sportspeople of Mexican descent
American expatriate sportspeople in Canada
MLS Next Pro players